The Men's 200 metre breaststroke competition of the 2022 European Aquatics Championships was held on 13 and 14 August 2022.

Records
Prior to the competition, the existing world, European and championship records were as follows.

Results

Heats
The heats were started on 13 August at 09:42.

Semifinals
The semifinals were started on 13 August at 19:04.

Final
The final was started on 14 August at 19:08.

References

Men's 200 metre breaststroke